Calliostoma alternum is a species of sea snail, a marine gastropod mollusk in the family Calliostomatidae.

Description
The height of the shell attains 16 mm. The umbilicate shell has a conical shape. It is finely sculptured. The aperture is subquadrate wit thin lips. The rather thin columella is weakly sigmoid and ends in a rounded denticle.

Distribution
This species occurs in the Caribbean Sea off Colombia, Venezuela and Suriname.

References

 J.F. Quinn, New Species of Calliostoma Swainson, 1840 (Gastropoda: Trochidae), and Notes on Some Poorly Known Species from the Western Atlantic Ocean; The Nautilus v. 106 (1992-1993)

External links
 To Biodiversity Heritage Library (1 publication)
 To Encyclopedia of Life
 To USNM Invertebrate Zoology Mollusca Collection
 To World Register of Marine Species
 

alternum
Gastropods described in 1992